Emile Marie Laurent (October 1, 1852 - October 1930), was the Prefect of Police of Paris from September 1914 to June 1917.

Biography
He was born October 1, 1852 in Brest, France. He served in the military from 25 October 1875 to 5 October 1877. He was appointed as the Prefect of Police of Paris  on September 2, 1914. He retired on June 5, 1917. He died in October 1930 in Paris.

References

1852 births
1930 deaths
Prefects of police of Paris